Gustave-Adolphe-Narcisse Turcotte (November 19, 1848 – October 4, 1918) was a Quebec physician and political figure. He represented Nicolet in the House of Commons of Canada as a Liberal member from 1907 to 1911. His name also appears as Gustave-Adolphe Turcotte.

He was born in Trois-Rivières, Canada East in 1848, the son of Joseph-Édouard Turcotte and Flore Buteau, and was educated at the Jesuit Collège Saint-Marie in Montreal and the Séminaire Saint-Joseph in Trois-Rivières. Turcotte served as registrar for Nicolet County. He ran unsuccessfully to represent Nicolet in the House of Commons in 1877 and 1878, losing to François-Xavier-Ovide Méthot each time. Turcotte was elected in a 1907 by-election held after Charles Ramsay Devlin resigned his seat to become a member of the Quebec cabinet. He was reelected in the 1908 federal election but was defeated when he ran for reelection in 1911.

He was married twice: first to Jeanne Leblanc and then to Emma, the daughter of Charles-Édouard Houde.

His illegitimate brother Arthur served in the Quebec assembly and was mayor of Trois-Rivières.

References 
 Canadian Parliamentary Guide, 1909, EJ Chambers

1848 births
1918 deaths
Liberal Party of Canada MPs
Members of the House of Commons of Canada from Quebec